Baskakov is a Russian masculine surname, its feminine counterpart is Baskakova. It may refer to

Irina Baskakova (born 1956), Russian sprint runner 
Nikolai Baskakov (1918–1993), Russian painter, member of the Saint Petersburg Union of Artists
Nikolay Baskakov (1905–1995), Russian Turkologist, linguist, and ethnologist
Vasili Baskakov (born 1962), Russian football coach and a former player
Yuri Baskakov (born 1964), Russian football referee

See also
Baskakov operator, generalizations of Bernstein polynomials, Szász–Mirakyan operators, and Lupas operators

Russian-language surnames